The U.S. House Financial Services Subcommittee on Housing and Insurance is a subcommittee of the House Committee on Financial Services. Between 2019 and 2013, it was known as the Subcommittee on Housing, Community Development and Insurance.

Jurisdiction
The Housing, Community Development and Insurance subcommittee oversees the U.S. Department of Housing and Urban Development and Ginnie Mae. The subcommittee also handles matters related to public, affordable, and rural housing, as well as community development including Empowerment Zones, and government-sponsored insurance programs, such as the National Flood Insurance Program. The jurisdiction over insurance was transferred in 2001 to the then-House Banking and Financial Services Committee from the House Energy and Commerce Committee. Since that time it had been the purview of the Subcommittee on Capital Markets, Insurance and Government Sponsored Enterprises. But "with plans to reform Fannie Mae and Freddie Mac expected to take up much of that panel's agenda, insurance instead [was] moved to a new Subcommittee on Insurance, Housing and Community Opportunity [as of the 112th Congress]."

Members, 117th Congress

Historical membership rosters

115th Congress

116th Congress

External links
Official Website

Notes

FinServ Housing